The Newtown Bee is a weekly newspaper for Newtown, Connecticut. Founded by John T. Pearce  in 1877, the Bee has been published continuously by the Smith family.  The Bee is owned by Bee Publishing Company.

In 1991 architect Roger P. Ferris of Southport, Connecticut designed a new printing plant for Bee Publishing,.  The building has a fieldstone base and cedar shingle walls and roof designed to fit in with Newtown's historic look.

On April 2, 2020 publisher R. Scudder Smith announced that the newspaper would suspend print publications temporarily in response to the COVID-19 pandemic to protect its employees. Online publication would continue with a reduced Staff. Print production resumed with the edition of June 5, 2021.

References

Mass media in Connecticut
1877 establishments in Connecticut